Delphi is a city in and the county seat of Carroll County, in the U.S. state of Indiana.  Located twenty minutes northeast of Lafayette, it is part of the Lafayette, Indiana Metropolitan Statistical Area. The population was 2,893 at the 2010 census.

History
Delphi was platted in 1828. It took its name from the ancient city of Delphi, in Greece. Several months after Delphi was founded, it was designated as the county seat.

The Barnett-Seawright-Wilson House, Carroll County Courthouse, Delphi City Hall, Delphi Courthouse Square Historic District, Delphi Methodist Episcopal Church, Foreman-Case House, and Niewerth Building are listed on the National Register of Historic Places.

Local heritage centers on the Wabash and Erie Canal, a canal and towpath that once bound together northern, central, and southern Indiana.  The segment of the canal that passes through Delphi has been rewatered and serves as the focus of canal activities.  A visitor center and museum, the Wabash & Erie Canal Interpretive Center, welcomes guests.

Delphi was the site of a widely publicized double murder in 2017.

Geography

Demographics

2010 census
At the 2010 census there were 2,893 people, 1,135 households, and 694 families living in the city. The racial makeup of the city was 91.7% White, 0.4% African American, 0.2% Native American, 0.2% Asian, 5.5% from other races, and 1.9% from two or more races. Hispanic or Latino of any race were 11.3%.

Of the 1,135 households 32.8% had children under the age of 18 living with them, 44.1% were married couples living together, 11.2% had a female householder with no husband present, 5.8% had a male householder with no wife present, and 38.9% were non-families. 33.1% of households were one person and 16.2% were one person aged 65 or older. The average household size was 2.46 and the average family size was 3.12.

The median age was 37.5 years. 25.9% of residents were under the age of 18; 8.5% were between the ages of 18 and 24; 25.5% were from 25 to 44; 22.3% were from 45 to 64; and 18% were 65 or older. The gender makeup of the city was 47.9% male and 52.1% female.

2000 census
At the 2000 census there were 3,015 people, 1,161 households, and 748 families living in the city. The racial makeup of the city was 92.57% White, 0.13% African American, 0.20% Native American, 0.27% Asian, 5.87% from other races, and 0.96% from two or more races. Hispanic or Latino of any race were 12.17%.

Of the 1,161 households 31.1% had children under the age of 18 living with them, 52.0% were married couples living together, 7.6% had a female householder with no husband present, and 35.5% were non-families. 31.3% of households were one person and 17.1% were one person aged 65 or older. The average household size was 2.50 and the average family size was 3.13.

The age distribution was 25.9% under the age of 18, 8.2% from 18 to 24, 29.6% from 25 to 44, 18.9% from 45 to 64, and 17.4% 65 or older. The median age was 35 years. For every 100 females, there were 96.7 males. For every 100 females age 18 and over, there were 90.9 males.

The median household income was $34,388 and the median family income  was $45,878. Males had a median income of $31,360 versus $18,575 for females. The per capita income for the city was $16,703. About 7.4% of families and 13.4% of the population were below the poverty line, including 21.9% of those under age 18 and 6.0% of those age 65 or over.

Education
The Delphi Community School Corporation operates public schools, including Delphi Community High School.

The city has a free lending library, the Delphi Public Library.

Notable people
 William "Dick the Bruiser" Afflis - professional wrestler
 Moses Clapp - Minnesota politician
 William V. Lucas - member of the 53rd United States House of Representatives
 Doxie Moore - professional basketball coach
 John Gould Moyer - 31st Governor of American Samoa
 Robert H. Shaffer - pioneer in the field of college student personnel and student affairs
 Betty Wason - author/broadcast journalist
 Gregory Wasson (born 1958) - president and CEO of Walgreens
 Clarence Whistler - professional wrestler of the 1880s
 Walter B. Rogers - musician and bandleader
Bob Olinger (Frontier Lawman) - last victim of Billy The Kid
 Abigail Williams and Libby German - victims of a double murder in February 2017.

Gallery

See also 

 Soldiers and Sailors Monument in Delphi
 Murphy Memorial Drinking Fountain
 Murders of Abigail Williams and Liberty German, known as the "Delphi murders" (2017)

References

External links
 City of Delphi, Indiana website

 
Cities in Indiana
Cities in Carroll County, Indiana
County seats in Indiana
Lafayette metropolitan area, Indiana
Populated places established in 1828
1828 establishments in Indiana